Miles Davis in Europe is a live album by Miles Davis, released in 1964. It was the first full album by the first incarnation of the "Second Quintet" featuring George Coleman, Herbie Hancock, Ron Carter and Tony Williams, whose first recordings with Davis had made up half of the album Seven Steps to Heaven.

The final songs of the concert, "Bye Bye Blackbird" and "The Theme", were released only on the box set Seven Steps: The Complete Columbia Recordings of Miles Davis 1963–1964. On the original LP, some of the tenor sax and piano solos were edited, although it still offered nearly an hour of music.

Track listing

Original LP 
Columbia – CS 8983:

CD reissue 
Columbia – CK 93583:

Personnel 
Miles Davis –  trumpet
George Coleman –  tenor saxophone
Herbie Hancock –  piano
Ron Carter –  bass
Tony Williams –  drums

References

Miles Davis live albums
1963 live albums
Sony BMG live albums
Albums recorded at Jazz à Juan
Albums produced by Teo Macero